Amiriyeh (also Romanized as Amīrīyeh; formerly, Amirabad, also Romanized as Amīrābād) is a city in and capital of Amirabad District, in Damghan County, Semnan Province, Iran. At the 2006 census, its population was 1,541, in 455 families.

References 

Populated places in Damghan County

Cities in Semnan Province